Newman Township is one of nine townships in Douglas County, Illinois, USA.  As of the 2010 census, its population was 1,080 and it contained 528 housing units.

Geography

Cities, towns, villages
 Newman

Cemeteries
The township contains Pleasant Ridge Cemetery.

Major highways
  U.S. Route 36
  Illinois Route 49

Demographics

School districts
 Heritage Community Unit School District 8
 Shiloh Community Unit School District 1

Political districts
 State House District 110
 State Senate District 55

References
 
 United States Census Bureau 2009 TIGER/Line Shapefiles
 United States National Atlas

External links
 City-Data.com
 Illinois State Archives
 Township Officials of Illinois

Townships in Douglas County, Illinois
Townships in Illinois